In human anatomy, the bronchial arteries supply the lungs with oxygenated blood, and nutrition. Although there is much variation, there are usually two bronchial arteries that run to the left lung, and one to the right lung, and are a vital part of the respiratory system.

Structure 
There are typically two left and one right bronchial arteries.

The left bronchial arteries (superior and inferior) usually arise directly from the thoracic aorta.

The single right bronchial artery usually arises from one of the following: 
 1) the thoracic aorta at a common trunk with the right 3rd posterior intercostal artery 
 2) the superior bronchial artery on the left side
 3) any number of the right intercostal arteries mostly the third right posterior.

Function 
The bronchial arteries supply blood to the bronchi and connective tissue of the lungs. They travel with and branch with the bronchi, ending about at the level of the respiratory bronchioles. They anastomose with the branches of the pulmonary arteries, and together, they supply the visceral pleura of the lung in the process.

Note that much of the oxygenated blood supplied by the bronchial arteries is returned via the pulmonary veins rather than the bronchial veins. As a consequence, blood returning to the left heart is slightly less oxygenated than blood found at the level of the pulmonary capillary beds.

Each bronchial artery also has a branch that supplies the esophagus.

Comparison with pulmonary arteries
It is easy to confuse the bronchial arteries with the pulmonary arteries, because they both supply the lungs with blood, but there are important differences:

Clinical significance
Bronchial artery is considered dilated when its diameter is more than 2 mm. Several causes of bronchial artery dilatations are: congenital heart or lung diseases, obstructions of pulmonary artery, and lung inflammation.

With modern surgical techniques, bronchial anastomoses heal well without bronchial artery reconnection. Largely for this reason, bronchial artery circulation is usually sacrificed during lung transplants, instead relying on the persistence of a microcirculation (presumably arising from the deoxygenated pulmonary circulation) to provide perfusion to the airways.

Aneurysms of the bronchial artery may mimic aortic aneurysms. Bronchial artery embolisation (BAE) is catheter insertion into a bronchial artery to treat hemoptysis (coughing blood)..  Most lung tumors are supplied by the bronchial artery, and they can be treated by chemoembolization (injecting chemotherapy and particles directly into the tumor-feeding artery).

The bronchial arteries and their supply of nutrients to the lungs are also attributed to the observation that an occluded (either ligated or by an embolus) pulmonal artery very rarely results in lung infarction. The bronchial arteries can maintain a supply of oxygenated blood to lung tissue.

See also 
 Bronchial veins
 Pulmonary thromboendarterectomy

References

External links 
  - "Branches of the ascending aorta, arch of the aorta, and the descending aorta."
 
 Bronchial arteries - anatquest.nlm.nih.gov.

Arteries of the thorax